Yvonne Yma (1887–1959) was a French stage and film actress.

Selected filmography
 Take Care of Amelie (1932)
 A Father Without Knowing It (1932)
 Student's Hotel (1932)
 The Barber of Seville (1933)
 The Brighton Twins (1936)
 Bach the Detective (1936)
 Excursion Train (1936)
 Wells in Flames (1937)
 The Man from Nowhere (1937)
 Return at Dawn (1938)
 Girls in Distress (1939)
 Immediate Call (1939)
 The White Slave (1939)
 Metropolitan (1939)
 Thunder Over Paris (1940)
 Miquette (1940)
 The Queen's Necklace (1946)
 Special Mission (1946)
 The Captain (1946)
 La Marie du port (1950)
 The Dream of Andalusia (1951)
 Three Women (1952)
 The Slave (1953)
 The Lottery of Happiness (1953)

References

Bibliography
 Phillips, Alastair. City of Darkness, City of Light: Émigré Filmmakers in Paris, 1929-1939. Amsterdam University Press, 2004.

External links

1887 births
1959 deaths
French stage actresses
French film actresses
Actresses from Paris